Rino Anto (born 3 January 1988) is an Indian professional footballer who plays as a right back for RoundGlass Punjab FC in the I-League.

Club career

Early career
Born in Thrissur, Kerala, Anto is a product of the Tata Football Academy in Jamshedpur, Jharkhand, where he graduated from in 2008. From 2008 to 2010 Anto played professionally in the I-League with Mohun Bagan before being released on 23 February 2010. Then, from 2010 to 2012, Anto played with Salgaocar in the I-League, scoring once against East Bengal at the Fatorda Stadium in a league match on 19 May 2011 in which he found the net in the 33rd minute as Salgaocar won 3–2. He also played one match for Salgaocar in the AFC Cup on 10 April 2012 against Jordan League side Al-Wehdat in which he started and played only 32 minutes, earning a yellow card, before being subbed off for Augustin Fernandes as Salgaocar went on to lose the match 1–2.

Quartz and Mohun Bagan
After playing two seasons with Salgaocar in the I-League, Anto signed for Quartz of the I-League 2nd Division in their search for promotion to the I-League. After not even being able to play in the 2nd Division, Anto joined the Kerala football team that played in the 2013 Santosh Trophy in which he reached the final before losing to Services football team 3–4 on penalties.

Then on 5 June 2013 it was reported that Anto, along with Wahid Sali, had signed with Mohun Bagan and thus return to the I-League for the 2013–14 season. However, on 24 June 2013, it was reported that Anto had been released from Mohun Bagan, less than 20 days after signing with the club on his second spell as the club could not afford his salary. He made no appearances with the club.

Bengaluru FC
Then, on 20 July 2013, it was announced during a mega-electric gala at the Bangalore Football Stadium that Anto was a part of the new direct-entry club Bengaluru FC squad, which would participate in the 2013–14 I-League. He made his debut for Bengaluru in the club's first ever I-League match on 22 September 2013 against Mohun Bagan at the Bangalore Football Stadium, in which he came on as a substitute for Keegan Pereira in the 71st minute as Bengaluru drew the match 1–1. In his debut season with the club, he won the I-League, as the club was declared winner after defeating Dempo.

The 2015 season started well for Anto, as Bengaluru FC reached the finals of Federation Cup by defeating Sporting Clube de Goa three goals to nil in the semifinal. Bengaluru won the final 2–1, as they won their maiden Federation Cup title. Anto also featured in the AFC Champions League qualifying match against Johor Darul Ta'zim. Rino signed a 2-year extension to his contract with Bengaluru which would keep him at the club until the end of the 2016-17 season.

Anto played his final match for Bengaluru on 31 May 2017 in an AFC Cup match against Maziya S&RC. He came on as an 87th-minute substitute for Sunil Chhetri as Bengaluru won 1–0.

Kerala Blasters
On 23 July 2017, Anto was selected in the 3rd round of the 2017–18 ISL Players Draft by the Kerala Blasters for the 2017–18 Indian Super League season. He made his debut for the club on 17 November 2017 against ATK. He started the match and helped the Blasters hold a 0–0 draw.

Return to Bengaluru FC
After 2017–18 season, Anto parted ways with Kerala Blasters and joined his former club, Bengaluru FC. BFC had the service of Khabra at right back. Anto would add quality to the BFC defence.

East Bengal
After 2019-20 season, Anto parted ways with Bengaluru FC. He joined East Bengal Football Club. It was his second stint with a Kolkata based club, first being with Mohun Bagan. East Bengal Football Club had the services of Samad Ali Mallick, Anto would strengthen the right back positio. Later in October 2020, East Bengal moved Rino Anto into their Reserve side.

International career 
On 25 February 2015, new Indian coach Stephen Constantine included Anto in the shortlist of 32 players for World Cup qualifier match against Nepal. However, due to his injury, he failed to make it into the shortlist of 26 players when Constantine declared in early March.

Rino made his national team debut on 11 June 2015 against Oman in a Group D game of the 2018 World Cup qualifier in a 1-2 loss at home in Bengaluru.

Career statistics

Honours

Club
Tata Football Academy
National Football League II: 2006

Mohun Bagan
Calcutta Football League
Hero Super Cup:
Federation cup: 2009–10

Salagaocar
I-League: 2010–11
Federation Cup: 2011–12

Bengaluru FC
 I-League (2): 2013–14, 2015—16
 Federation Cup (2): 2014–15, 2016-17
Indian Super League: 2018–19
AFC Cup: runner-up 2016

Kerala Blasters
Indian Super League runner-up: 2016
Kerala
Santosh Trophy: runner-up 2012–13

References

1988 births
Living people
Footballers from Thrissur
Mohun Bagan AC players
Salgaocar FC players
Bengaluru FC players
ATK (football club) players
Indian Super League players
Association football defenders
I-League players
Kerala Blasters FC players
Indian footballers
India international footballers